Events from the year 1899 in Taiwan, Empire of Japan.

Incumbents

Central government of Japan
 Prime Minister – Yamagata Aritomo

Taiwan
 Governor-General – Kodama Gentarō

Events

July
 20 July – The opening of Badu Station in Taihoku Prefecture.

References

 
Years of the 19th century in Taiwan